Prairieville is an unincorporated community in Rice County, Minnesota, United States, east of Faribault.

The community is located at the junction of State Highway 60 (MN 60) and Eiler Avenue.

Prairieville is located within Cannon City Township and Walcott Township.

References

Unincorporated communities in Minnesota
Unincorporated communities in Rice County, Minnesota